Ba Tri is a rural district (huyện) of Bến Tre province in the Mekong Delta region of Vietnam. As of 2004 the district had a population of 201,802. The district covers an area of 351 km². The district capital lies at Ba Tri. In 2013, the population decreased to 191,097 people with a mean density of 538.3 people per square kilometer.
 
The district is in the east of Bến Tre Province. It is bordered to the east by the South China Sea, to the north by the Ba Lai River, to the south by the Hàm Luông river and to the west by Giồng Trôm district.

In the capital of Ba Tri lies the final resting place of the famed 19th-century poet Nguyễn Đình Chiểu, known for his patriotic anti-colonial writings. It has been visited by dignitaries including Nông Đức Mạnh.

The commune of Bảo Thạnh is the home of Phan Thanh Giản, a leading mandarin of Tự Đức who was also the first southerner to gain a PhD in the imperial court examinations.

The commune of Bảo Thuận among others is known for tourism.

Administrative divisions
The district is divided into one township, Ba Tri (capital), and the following communes:

An Hòa Tây
An Thủy
Vĩnh An
An Đức
An Bình Tây
An Hiệp
An Ngãi Tây
Tân Hưng
An Ngãi Trung
An Phú Trung
Mỹ Thạnh
Mỹ Nhơn
Mỹ Chánh
Mỹ Hòa
Tân Mỹ
Tân Xuân
Phước Tuy
Bảo Thạnh
Phú Ngãi
Phú Lễ
Vĩnh Hòa
Tân Thủy
Bảo Thuận

References

Districts of Bến Tre province